Fabián Andrés Rinaudo (born 15 May 1987 in Armstrong, Santa Fe) is an Argentinian footballer who plays as a midfielder. Rinaudo also holds an Italian passport, and sometimes plays with his nickname, Fito, on his shirt.

Club career

Gimnasia La Plata
He made his league debut for Gimnasia y Esgrima de La Plata in a 0–0 draw against River Plate on 5 October 2008. In the 2009-10 season he was awarded the prize for best player in the Torneo Apertura and second-best for the Torneo Clausura. He played 100 games for Gimnasia, his last one being a 1–1 draw against San Martín de San Juan, result that relegated Gimnasia to the Primera B Nacional.

Sporting Clube de Portugal
On 3 July 2011, Fito Rinaudo joined Portuguese club Sporting Clube de Portugal for an undisclosed fee, signing a four-year contract with a €25M minimum fee release clause. Sporting signed him in a leverage deal as the club later sold 15% economic rights to Sporting Portugal Fund for €525,000 and another 50% to Quality Sports Investments for €1.1 million. The club retained 35% economic rights on future transfer fee.

After Sporing sold the registration rights of Rinaudo to Catania, Sporting also paid €480,000 to Sporting Portugal Fund.

Calcio Catania
On 10 January 2014, he was loaned to Calcio Catania and made the move permanent later in July 2014 in a 3-year contract, for €1.6 million fee plus bonuses. Sporting would also receive 50% of the future transfer fee if Catania sold the player.

On 17 August 2015, Rinaudo was loaned back to Argentina for Gimnasia. The loan was renewed on 8 August 2016.

International career
On 20 May 2009, Rinaudo made his international debut in a friendly match against Panama. The Argentine team, made up of players based in the Primera División Argentina won the game 3–1.

References

External links

1987 births
Living people
Argentine footballers
Argentine people of Italian descent
Argentine expatriate footballers
Argentina international footballers
Association football defenders
Argentine Primera División players
Primeira Liga players
Serie A players
Serie B players
Club de Gimnasia y Esgrima La Plata footballers
Sporting CP footballers
Catania S.S.D. players
Rosario Central footballers
Argentine expatriate sportspeople in Portugal
Expatriate footballers in Portugal
Sportspeople from Santa Fe Province